Portland, Oregon, United States supports a multitude of media, including long-established newspapers, television and radio stations; a number of smaller local art, culture, neighborhood and political publications; filmmaking; and, most recently, Internet media development. Portland has the 22nd largest newspaper, the 23rd largest radio and the 22nd largest television market in the United States. The Portland media market also serves Vancouver, Washington.

Newspapers

Daily 
The Oregonian is the only daily general-interest newspaper serving Portland. It also circulates throughout the state and in Clark County, Washington. The Vancouver, Washington-based newspaper The Columbian also covers general news from Portland.

Alternative weekly 
Smaller local newspapers, distributed free of charge in newspaper boxes and at venues around the city

 Portland Tribune (general-interest paper published on Tuesdays and Thursdays), 
 Willamette Week (general-interest alternative weekly), 
 Portland Mercury (bi-weekly, targeted at younger urban readers),

Neighborhood newspapers 

 Northwest Examiner, a monthly newspaper with a circulation of 23,000 distributed by saturation mailing with news from northwest Portland, Pearl District and Goose Hollow. The publisher was established in 1986.
 Southeast Examiner, a monthly newspaper with a circulation of 24,600 covering SE Portland from SE Water Ave to SE 82nd as well as NE Laurelhurst area to SE Powell Blvd. 
 Southwest News is a monthly newspaper mailed to every resident of the Southwest Neighborhoods, Inc coalition and it is published by the coalition. Approximately 9,000 copies are mailed, as well as distributed in the lobby of the Multnomah Arts Center.
 Sellwood Bee is a monthly newspaper established in 1906 and serves the inner southeast neighborhoods.

Interest-specific 

 The Asian Reporter (a weekly covering Asian news, both international and local),
 Christian News Northwest, a regional monthly newspaper serving the evangelical Christian community.
 Daily Journal of Commerce. Portland Monthly is a monthly news and culture magazine.
 The Portland Alliance, a largely anti-authoritarian progressive monthly, is the largest radical print paper in the city.
 Portland Business Journal, Weekly. Covers business-related news.
 Portland Indymedia is one of the oldest and largest Independent Media Centers.
 Street Roots, is a weekly street newspaper published by a homeless advocacy group Street Roots. It is sold within the city by vendors.

Discontinued 
Just Out was an LGBT publication published twice monthly from 1983 to 2011.

Television

The Portland metro area is the 22nd largest U.S. market area with 1,182,180 homes with TVs and 1.035% of the U.S. market. In addition, the Portland Television market area is considered as serving the entire state of Oregon.  The major network television affiliates include: (Network O&O Stations are found in bold)

Radio

The Portland metro area is the 23rd largest radio market in the U.S.

AM stations

FM stations

Internet
QPDX.com, news and events website

References

 
Portland